Newtown St Boswells is a village in the historic county of Roxburghshire which houses the administrative centre of the Scottish Borders council area. The village lies south of the Eildon Hills on the Sprouston and Newtown burns, between the larger settlements of St Boswells  to the south-east and Melrose  to the north-west.

History
Newtown St Boswells is an old settlement, well-established by the 16th century. The town has been known at various times as Newtoune, Newtown of Eildon, Neuton and Newtown of Dryburgh. It lies split between the civil parishes of Melrose and St Boswells.

Historically, Newtown St Boswells was a centre for milling grain, with watermills on its burns. It became a regional centre of communication and an exporter of livestock after the opening of its railway station. This importance has declined since the closure of the station in 1969.

Roxburghshire County Council established offices at Newtown St Boswells in 1896, and subsequently moved its meeting place there from Jedburgh in 1930. A large new building was added to the site in 1968. From 1975 to 1996, the offices served as the administrative centre for Borders Regional Council. Since the 1996 the offices have been the headquarters of Scottish Borders Council and known as the Council Headquarters.

Education
The primary school also has nursery provision for preschool-aged children. A Borders College campus at the southeastern tip of the village specialises in agricultural education.

References

External links
RCAHMS/Canmore: Newtown St Boswells, St Boswells Station and Granary
Gazetteer for Scotland: Newtown St Boswells
Scottish Borders Council, regeneration of Newtown St Boswells

Villages in the Scottish Borders